The 2015 Chicago White Sox season was the club's 116th season in Chicago and 115th in the American League.

Offseason
The 2014 Chicago White Sox ended with a 73-89 record, a 10-game improvement over 2013. General Manager Rick Hahn gave the season a "fail" grade, citing the lack of a championship. The White Sox front office set up an "aggressive" offseason plan, focusing on improving a bullpen that blew 21 saves and had the 3rd-worst earned run average in baseball. Despite losing 188 games the previous two seasons, Robin Ventura is set to remain as manager for the 2015 season.

Roster changes
The White Sox offseason started at the end of October when Moises Sierra was claimed by the Kansas City Royals off waivers. Shortly following this, the Sox declined Felipe Paulino's option for 2015, after going 0-2 in just four starts. Reliever Matt Lindstrom also elected free agency at the end of the month after an ankle injury kept him off the mound for most of 2014.

On November 3, the White Sox claimed outfielder J. B. Shuck off waivers from the Cleveland Indians.  Two weeks later, the team began its quest to improve the bullpen by signing free agent reliever Zach Duke to a three year/$15 million contract. The rest of November included mostly minor league moves, until the White Sox signed free agent first baseman Adam LaRoche to a two year/$25 million contract on November 25. The corresponding roster move was to designate pitcher Scott Carroll for assignment, who would later become a free agent.

The 2014 Winter Meetings ran from December 7–11 in San Diego. The White Sox' first move of the Winter Meetings was to claim catcher Rob Brantly of waivers from Miami. Late that night, there were rumors that the White Sox were close to singing David Robertson from the New York Yankees as well as trading for Jeff Samardzija from the Oakland Athletics. On December 9, the club officially announced a four-year, $46 million contract with Robertson and acquired pitchers Jeff Samardzija and Michael Ynoa from Oakland for infielders Marcus Semien and Rangel Ravelo, catcher Josh Phegley and pitcher Chris Bassitt. They finished off the Winter Meetings by trading pitcher Andre Rienzo to Miami for pitcher Dan Jennings.

On December 16, the White Sox announced the signing of outfielder Melky Cabrera to a three-year, $42 million contract. The White Sox cited the increase in ticket sales following the Robertson and Samardzija signings as motivation for signing Cabrera. On January 5, 2015, the club signed infielder Emilio Bonifacio to a one-year, $4 million contract. The last major move of the off-season was a surprise, as the White Sox signed infielder Gordon Beckham, whom they had traded to the Los Angeles Angels just a few months prior, to a one-year, $2 million contract and designated outfielder Dayán Viciedo for assignment.

Events and news

On October 30, the Baseball Hall of Fame announced the 10 candidates for election via the Golden Era Committee. Among the candidates were White Sox legends Minnie Miñoso and Billy Pierce; Dick Allen, who won the 1972 American League Most Valuable Player award; and Jim Kaat, who played two and a half seasons with the White Sox. On December 8, the Hall of Fame announced that none of the candidates earned the required 12 voters, with Allen earning 11 votes, Kaat earning 10, Minoso earning 8, and Pierce receiving less than 3. White Sox chairman Jerry Reinsdorf was "disappointed" in the results, particularly the rejection of 90-year-old Minoso, saying "I don't know what player out of the era of the 1950s and early '60s would be more deserving than Minnie."

On December 7, the media reported that the White Sox had denied the Toronto Blue Jays permission to interview Executive Vice President Ken Williams for their opening at club President. Reinsdorf was reportedly upset that the Blue Jays asked for permission during the Winter Meetings. When he talked to Williams about it, Williams said that Toronto had already contacted him, which is considered tampering under Major League Baseball rules. The White Sox opted not to pursue recourse.

On February 19, the club released their 2015 broadcast schedule, with 106 games on Comcast SportsNet Chicago, 35 games on WGN-TV, and 20 games on WPWR-TV. This is a change from previous seasons, where a small amount of WGN produced games were broadcast on WCIU-TV instead of WPWR. It had previously been announced that games on WGN-TV would no longer be simulcast nationally on WGN America, ending Major League Baseball's superstation era. Spanish radio broadcasts switched from WEBG (formerly WNUA) back to 1200 WRTO-AM.

On March 1, White Sox legend Minnie Miñoso died early in the morning due to a heart-related issue. Hundreds of Sox fans attended the funeral of "Mr. White Sox" on March 7.

Regular season

Season standings

American League Central

American League Wild Card

Record against opponents

Detailed records

Season
 On April 29, the Sox lost to Baltimore 8–2  at Camden Yards in the only game in MLB history played without fans allowed to attend. The two previous games in the series had been postponed due to riots in Baltimore, but the third could not be so easily rescheduled or relocated, so the Orioles decided not to admit fans since the police were too busy maintaining order elsewhere in the city to provide adequate security at the game.

Game log

|- align="center" bgcolor="#ffbbbb"
| 1 || April 6 || @ Royals || 3:10pm || 1–10 || Ventura (1–0) || Samardzija (0–1) || — || 0–1 || 40,085 || L1
|- align="center" bgcolor="#ffbbbb"
| 2 || April 8 || @ Royals || 7:10pm || 5–7 || Davis (1–0) || Putnam (0–1) || Holland (1) || 0–2 ||  23,385 || L2
|- align="center" bgcolor="#ffbbbb"
| 3 || April 9 || @ Royals || 1:10pm || 1–4 || Vólquez (1–0) || Danks (0–1) || Holland (2) || 0–3 || 20,236 || L3
|- align="center" bgcolor="#ffbbbb"
| 4 || April 10 || Twins || 3:10pm || 0–6 || Milone (1−0)  || Noesí (0−1)  || Duensing (1)  || 0–4  || 38,533 || L4
|- align="center" bgcolor="#bbffbb"
| 5 || April 11 || Twins || 1:10pm || 5–4 || Duke (1−0) || Boyer (0−1) || Robertson (1) || 1–4 || 22,317 || W1
|- align="center" bgcolor="#bbffbb"
| 6 || April 12 || Twins || 1:10pm || 6–2 || Sale (1−0) || Hughes (0−2) || — || 2–4 || 23,057 || W2
|- align="center" bgcolor="#bbffbb"
| 7 || April 14 || @ Indians || 6:10pm || 4–1 || Quintana (1–0) || Carrasco (1–1) || Robertson (2) || 3–4 || 10,642 || W3
|- align="center" bgcolor="#ffbbbb"
| 8 || April 15 || @ Indians || 11:10pm || 2–4 || Bauer (2–0) || Danks (0–2) || Allen (2) || 3–5 || 11,042 || L1
|- align="center" bgcolor="#ffbbbb"
| 9 || April 17 || @ Tigers || 12:08pm || 1–2 || Soria (1–0) || Duke (1−1) || — || 3–6 || 33,084 || L2
|- align="center" bgcolor="#bbffbb"
| 10 || April 18 || @ Tigers || 12:08pm || 12–3 || Sale (2−0) || Sánchez (1–2) || — || 4–6 || 39,877 || W1
|- align="center" bgcolor="#ffbbbb"
| 11 || April 19 || @ Tigers || 12:08pm || 1–9 || Greene (3–0) || Quintana (1–1) || — || 4–7 || 30,357 || L1
|- align="center" bgcolor="#bbffbb"
| 12 || April 20 || Indians || 7:10pm || 4–3 || Robertson (1–0) || Allen (0–2) || — || 5–7 || 13,055 || W1
|- align="center" bgcolor="#ffbbbb"
| 13 || April 21 || Indians || 7:10pm || 2–6 || Carrasco (2–1) || Noesí (0–2) || — || 5–8 || 14,032 || L1
|- align="center" bgcolor="#bbffbb"
| 14 || April 22 || Indians || 1:10pm || 6–0 || Samardzija (1–1) || Kluber (0–2) || — || 6–8 || 14,429 || W1
|- align="center" bgcolor="#ffbbbb"
| 15 || April 23 || Royals || 7:10pm || 2–3  || Morales (2–0) || Petricka (0–1) || Davis (4) || 6–9 || 14,218 || L1
|- align="center" bgcolor="#bbbbbb"
| (16) || April 24 || Royals || 7:10pm || 2–2 (8) || colspan="4" |  Suspended (rain) (Resumed: April 26)  || 20,350 || (L1)
|- align="center" bgcolor="#bbbbbb"
| -- || April 25 || Royals || 7:10pm ||colspan=7| Postponed (rain) (Rescheduled for July 17)
|- align="center" bgcolor="#bbffbb"
| 16 || April 26 || Royals || 1:10pm || 3–2* || Robertson (2–0) || Herrera (0–1) || — || 7–9 || rowspan=2|23,317 || W1
|- align="center" bgcolor="#bbffbb"
| 17 || April 26 || Royals || 7:10pm || 5–3 || Danks (1–2) || Vólquez (2–2) || Robertson (3) || 8–9  || W2
|- align="center" bgcolor="#bbbbbb"
| -- || April 27 || @ Orioles || 6:05pm ||colspan=7| Postponed (safety concerns due to 2015 Baltimore riots) (Rescheduled for May 28)
|- align="center" bgcolor="#bbbbbb"
| -- || April 28 || @ Orioles || 6:05pm ||colspan=7| Postponed (safety concerns due to 2015 Baltimore riots) (Rescheduled for May 28)
|- align="center" bgcolor="#ffbbbb"
| 18 || April 29 || @ Orioles || 1:05pm || 2–8 || Jiménez (2–1) || Samardzija (1–2) || — || 8–10 || 0 || L1
|- align="center" bgcolor="#ffbbbb"
| 19 || April 30 || @ Twins || 7:10pm || 2–12 || May (2–1) || Sale (2–1) || — || 8–11 || 20,736 || L2
|-

|- align="center" bgcolor="#ffbbbb"
| 20 || May 1 || @ Twins || 7:10pm || 0–1 || Gibson (2-2) || Quintana (1-2) || Perkins (7) || 8–12 || 22,794 || L3 
|- align="center" bgcolor="#ffbbbb"
| 21 || May 2 || @ Twins || 1:10pm || 3–5 || Nolasco (1-1) || Noesí (0-3) || Perkins (8) || 8–13 || 30,551 || L4
|- align="center" bgcolor="#ffbbbb"
| 22 || May 3 || @ Twins || 1:10pm || 3–13 || Pressly (1-0) || Danks (1-3) || — || 8–14 || 22,423 || L5
|- align="center" bgcolor="#bbffbb"
| 23 || May 5 || Tigers || 7:10pm || 5–2 || Samardzija (2–2) || Greene (3–2) || Robertson (4) || 9–14 || 16,351 || W1
|- align="center" bgcolor="#bbffbb"
| 24 || May 6 || Tigers || 7:10pm || 7–6 || Putnam (1–1) || Chamberlain (0–1) || Robertson (5) || 10–14 || 18,268 || W2
|- align="center" bgcolor="#ffbbbb"
| 25 || May 7 || Tigers || 1:10pm || 1–4 || Lobstein (3–2) || Quintana (1–3) || Soria (11) || 10–15 || 20,081 || L1
|- align="center" bgcolor="#bbbbbb"
| — || May 8 || Reds || 7:10pm ||colspan=7| Postponed (rain) (Rescheduled for May 9)
|- align="center" bgcolor="#ffbbbb"
| 26 || May 9 || Reds || 3:10pm || 4–10 || Cueto (3–3) || Carroll (0–1) || — || 10–16 || N/A || L2
|- align="center" bgcolor="#bbffbb"
| 27 || May 9 || Reds || Game 2 || 8–2 || Rodon (1–0) || Marquis (3–2) || — || 11–16 || 27,980 || W1
|- align="center" bgcolor="#bbffbb"
| 28 || May 10 || Reds || 1:10pm || 4–3 || Robertson (3–0) || Chapman (1-1) || — || 12–16 || 20,123 || W2
|- align="center" bgcolor="#ffbbbb"
| 29 || May 11 || @Brewers || 6:20pm || 7–10 || Broxton (1–0) || Duke (1–2) || Rodríguez (7) || 12–17 || 29,886 || L1
|- align="center" bgcolor="#bbffbb"
| 30 || May 12 || @Brewers || 7:10pm || 4–2 || Sale (3–1) || Blazek (3–1) || Robertson (6) || 13–17 || 26,935 || W1
|- align="center" bgcolor="#bbffbb"
| 31 || May 13 || @Brewers || 7:10pm || 4–2 || Quintana (2–3) || Nelson (1–4) || Robertson (7) || 14–17 || 29,679 || W2
|- align="center" bgcolor="#bbffbb"
| 32 || May 15 || @ Athletics || 9:07pm || 7–6 || Carroll (1–1) || Abad (0–2) || Duke (1) || 15–17 || 21,464 || W3
|- align="center" bgcolor="#bbffbb"
| 33 || May 16 || @ Athletics || 6:07pm || 4–3 || Danks (2-3) || Rodriguez (0-1) || Robertson (8) || 16–17 || 28,445 || W4
|- align="center" bgcolor="#bbffbb"
| 34 || May 17 || @ Athletics || 3:07pm || 7–3 || Samardzija (3-2) || Kazmir (2–2) || — || 17–17 || 33,195 || W5
|- align="center" bgcolor="#bbffbb"
| 35 || May 18 || Indians || 7:10pm || 2–1 (10) || Duke (2-2) || McAllister (0-2) || — || 18–17 || 17,712 || W6
|- align="center" bgcolor="#ffbbbb"
| 36 || May 19 || Indians || 7:10pm || 1–3 || Bauer (3-1) || Quintana (2-4) || Allen (7) || 18–18 || 15,681 || L1
|- align="center" bgcolor="#ffbbbb"
| 37 || May 20 || Indians || 7:10pm || 3–4 || Marcum (1-0) || Jennings (0-1) || Allen (8) || 18–19 || 15,146 || L2
|- align="center" bgcolor="#ffbbbb"
| 38 || May 21 || Indians || 7:10pm || 2–5 || Salazar (5-1) || Danks (2-4) || — || 18–20 || 18,321 || L3
|- align="center" bgcolor="#bbffbb"
| 39 || May 22 || Twins || 7:10pm || 3–2 || Samardzija (4-2) || Thompson (0-1) || Robertson (9) || 19–20 || 21,067 || W1
|- align="center" bgcolor="#ffbbbb"
| 40 || May 23 || Twins || 3:10pm || 3–4 || May (3-3) || Sale (3-2) || Perkins (16) || 19–21 || 38,714 || L1
|- align="center" bgcolor="#ffbbbb"
| 41 || May 24 || Twins || 1:10pm || 1–8 || Gibson (4-3) || Quintana (2-5) || — || 19–22 || 30,180 || L2
|- align="center" bgcolor="#ffbbbb"
| 42 || May 25 || @ Blue Jays || 6:07pm || 0–6 || Hutchison (4–1) || Noesí (0–4) || — || 19–23 || 15,168 || L3
|- align="center" bgcolor="#ffbbbb"
| 43 || May 26 || @ Blue Jays || 6:07pm || 9–10 || Delabar (1–0) || Robertson (3–1) || — || 19–24 || 17,276 || L4
|- align="center" bgcolor="#bbffbb"
| 44 || May 27 || @ Blue Jays || 6:07pm || 5–3  || Robertson (4–1) || Osuna (1–1) || — || 20–24 || 15,463 || W1
|- align="center" bgcolor="#bbffbb"
| 45 || May 28 || @ Orioles || 4:05pm || 3–2 || Sale (4–2) || Wilson (1–1) || Petricka (1) || 21–24 || 18,441 || W2
|- align="center" bgcolor="#ffbbbb"
| 46 || May 28 || @ Orioles || 2nd Game || 3–6 || Wright (2–0) || Beck (0–1) || Britton (13) || 21–25 || 18,441 || L1
|- align="center" bgcolor="#bbffbb"
| 47 || May 29 || @ Astros || 7:10pm || 6–3 || Jennings (1–1) || Fields (2–1) || Robertson (10) || 22–25 || 25,957 || W1
|- align="center" bgcolor="#ffbbbb"
| 48 || May 30 || @ Astros || 3:10pm || 0–3 || Keuchel (7–1) || Quintana (2–6) || — || 22–26 || 29,720 || L1
|- align="center" bgcolor="#bbffbb"
| 49 || May 31 || @ Astros || 1:10pm || 6–0 || Danks (3–4) || Hernández (2–4)  || — || 23–26 || 27,423 || W1
|-

|- align="center" bgcolor="#ffbbbb"
| 50 || June 2 || @ Rangers || 7:05pm || 2–15 || Lewis (5–0) || Samardzija (4-3) || — || 23–27 || 27,558 || L1
|- align="center" bgcolor="#bbffbb"
| 51 || June 3 || @ Rangers || 7:05pm || 9–2 || Sale (5–2) || Martinez (4–2) || — || 24–27 || 32,598 || W1
|- align="center" bgcolor="#ffbbbb"
| 52 || June 4 || @ Rangers || 7:05pm || 1–2 (11) || Scheppers (2–0) ||  Jennings (1–2) ||  || 24–28 || 27,616 || L1
|- align="center" bgcolor="#bbffbb"
| 53 || June 5 || Tigers || 7:10pm || 4–3 (11) || Petricka (1–1) || Wilson (1–2) ||  || 25–28 ||  24,761 || W1
|- align="center" bgcolor="#ffbbbb"
| 54 || June 6 || Tigers || 6:15pm || 1–7 || Price (5–2) || Danks (3–5) || — || 25–29 ||  28,368 || L1
|- align="center" bgcolor="#ffbbbb"
| 55 || June 7 || Tigers || 1:10pm || 4–6 || Simón (6–3) || Samardzija (4–4) || Soria (16) || 25–30 || 29,059 || L2
|- align="center" bgcolor="#bbffbb"
| 56 || June 8 || Astros || 7:10pm || 3–1 || Sale (6–2) || McCullers (2-1) || Robertson (11) || 26–30 || 17,352 || W1
|- align="center" bgcolor="#bbffbb"
| 57 || June 9 || Astros || 7:10pm || 4–2 || Rodon (2–0) || Keuchel (7–2) || Robertson (12) || 27–30 || 18,439 || W2
|- align="center" bgcolor="#bbffbb"
| 58 || June 10 || Astros || 7:10pm || 4–1 || Quintana (3–6) || Sipp (2–3) || Robertson (13) || 28–30 || 17,455 || W3
|- align="center" bgcolor="#ffbbbb"
| 59 || June 12 || @ Rays || 6:10pm || 5–7 || Andriese (1–1) || Danks (3–6) || McGee (2) || 28–31 || 13,448 || L1
|- align="center" bgcolor="#ffbbbb"
| 60 || June 13 || @ Rays || 3:10pm || 4–5 || Boxberger (4–3) || Putnam (1–2) || McGee (3) || 28–32 ||  20,248 || L2
|- align="center" bgcolor="#ffbbbb"
| 61 || June 14 || @ Rays || 12:10pm || 1–2 || Riefenhauser (1–0) || Sale (6–3) || Jepsen (5) || 28–33 ||  17,962 || L3
|- align="center" bgcolor="#ffbbbb"
| 62 || June 15 || @ Pirates || 6:05pm || 0–11 || Liriano (4–5) || Rodon (2–1) || – || 28–34 || 24,536 || L4
|- align="center" bgcolor="#ffbbbb"
| 63 || June 16 || @ Pirates || 6:05pm || 0–3 || Morton (5–0) || Quintana (3–7) || Melancon (21) || 28–35 || 28,413 || L5
|- align="center" bgcolor="#ffbbbb"
| 64 || June 17 || Pirates || 7:10pm || 2–3 || Locke (4–3) || Danks (3–7) || Melancon (22) || 28–36 || 19,194 || L6
|- align="center" bgcolor="#ffbbbb"
| 65 || June 18 || Pirates || 7:10pm || 2–3 || Cole (11–2) || Petricka (1–2) || Melancon (23) || 28–37 || 21,296 || L7
|- align="center" bgcolor="#ffbbbb"
| 66 || June 19 || Rangers || 7:10pm || 1–2 || Lewis (7–3) || Robertson (4–2) || Tolleson (10) || 28–38 || 22,864 || L8
|- align="center" bgcolor="#bbffbb"
| 67 || June 20 || Rangers || 1:10pm || 3–2 || Rodon (3–1) || Martinez (5–3) || Robertson (14) || 29–38 ||  25,738 || W1
|- align="center" bgcolor="#bbffbb"
| 68 || June 21 || Rangers || 1:10pm || 3–2 (11) || Petricka (2–2) || Claudio (1–1) || — || 30–38 ||  33,668 || W2
|- align="center" bgcolor="#ffbbbb"
| 69 || June 22 || @ Twins || 7:10pm || 2–13 || Milone (4–1) || Danks (3–8) || — || 30–39 || 24,094 || L1
|- align="center" bgcolor="#bbffbb"
| 70 || June 23 || @ Twins || 7:10pm || 6–2 || Samardzija (5–4) || Pelfrey (5–4) || Petricka (2) || 31–39 || 27,349 || W1
|- align="center" bgcolor="#ffbbbb"
| 71 || June 24 || @ Twins || 12:10pm || 1–6 || Hughes (6–6) || Sale (6–4) || — || 31–40 || 28,854 || L1
|- align="center" bgcolor="#bbffbb"
| 72 || June 25 || @ Tigers || 12:08pm || 8–7 (10) || Duke (3-2) || Chamberlain (0–2) || Robertson (15) || 32–40 || 40,355 || W1
|- align="center" bgcolor="#ffbbbb"
| 73 || June 26 || @ Tigers || 6:08pm || 4–5 || Rondon (1–0) || Duke (3-3) || Soria (17) || 32–41 || 38,455 || L1
|- align="center" bgcolor="#bbbbbb"
| — || June 27 || @ Tigers || 3:08pm ||colspan=7| Postponed (rain) (Rescheduled for September 21)
|- align="center" bgcolor="#ffbbbb"
| 74 || June 28 || @ Tigers || 12:08pm || 4–5 || Soria (3–0) || Putnam (1-3) || — || 32–42 ||  39,455 || L2
|- align="center" bgcolor="#bbffbb"
| 75 || June 30 || @ Cardinals || 7:10pm || 2–1 (11) || Webb (1-0) || Socolovich (2–1) || Robertson (16) || 33–42 || 45,626 || W1
|-

|- align="center" bgcolor="#bbffbb"
| 76 || July 1 || @ Cardinals || 7:15pm || 7–1 || Quintana (4–7) || Lackey (6-5) || — || 34–42 || 41,696 || W2
|- align="center" bgcolor="#bbffbb"
| 77 || July 3 || Orioles || 7:10pm || 1–0 || Danks (4–8) || Jiménez (7–4) || Robertson (17) || 35–42 || 27,384 || W3
|- align="center" bgcolor="#bbffbb"
| 78 || July 4 || Orioles || 1:10pm || 3–2 || Putnam (2–3) || Norris (2–8) || Robertson (18) || 36–42 || 22,559 || W4
|- align="center" bgcolor="#ffbbbb"
| 79 || July 5 || Orioles || 1:10pm || 1–9 || González (7–5) || Rodon (3–2) || — || 36–43 ||  22,519 || L1
|- align="center" bgcolor="#bbffbb"
| 80 || July 6 || Blue Jays || 7:10pm || 4–2 || Sale (7–4) || Buehrle (9–5) || — || 37–43 || 24,593 || W1
|- align="center" bgcolor="#ffbbbb"
| 81 || July 7 || Blue Jays || 7:10pm || 1–2 || Doubront (1–0) || Quintana (4–8) || Osuna (4) || 37–44 || 17,028 || L1
|- align="center" bgcolor="#bbffbb"
| 82 || July 8 || Blue Jays || 7:10pm || 7–6 (11) || Putnam (3–3) || Osuna (1-3) || — || 38–44 || 17,032 || W1
|- align="center" bgcolor="#bbffbb"
| 83 || July 9 || Blue Jays || 1:10pm || 2–0 || Samardzija (6–4) || Dickey (3–10) || — || 39–4 || 23,298 || W2
|- align="center" bgcolor="#bbffbb"
| 84 || July 10 || @ Cubs || 3:05pm || 1–0 || Petricka (3–2) || Rondón (3–2) || Robertson (19) || 40–44 || 41,580 || W3
|- align="center" bgcolor="#bbffbb"
| 85 || July 11 || @ Cubs || 3:05pm || 5–1 || Sale (8–4) || Lester (4–8) || — || 41–44 || 41,596 || W4
|- align="center" bgcolor="#ffbbbb"
| 86 || July 12 || @ Cubs || 1:20pm || 1–3 || Arrieta (10–5) || Quintana (4–9) || — || 41–45 || 41,688 || L1
|-  style="text-align:center; bgcolor="bbcaff"
| ASG || July 14 || All-Star Game@ Cincinnati, OH || 7:05pm || AL, 6–3 || Price (AL, DET) || Kershaw (NL, LAD) ||  ||  || 43,656 || ASG
|- style="text-align:center; bgcolor="bbcaff"
| ASG ||colspan="10" | The White Sox were represented in the All-Star game by Chris Sale.
|- align="center" bgcolor="#ffbbbb"
| 87 || July 17 || Royals || 1:10pm || 2–4 || Young (8–5) || Samardzija (6–5) || Holland (20) || 41–46 || 25,807 || L2
|- align="center" bgcolor="#bbffbb"
| 88 || July 17 || Royals || 7:10pm || 2–0 || Danks (5–8) || Vólquez (8–5) || Robertson (20) || 42–46 || 25,701 || W1
|- align="center" bgcolor="#ffbbbb"
| 89 || July 18 || Royals || 1:10pm || 6–7 (13) || Finnegan (3–0) || Jennings (1–3) || Madson (1) || 42–47 || 33,559 || L1
|- align="center" bgcolor="#ffbbbb"
| 90 || July 19 || Royals || 1:10pm || 1–4 || Duffy (4–4) || Sale (8–5) || Blanton (1) || 42–48 || 32,175 || L2
|- align="center" bgcolor="#ffbbbb"
| 91 || July 21 || Cardinals || 7:10pm || 5–8 || Wacha (11–3) || Rodon (3–3) || Rosenthal (28) || 42–49 || 29,728 || L3
|- align="center" bgcolor="#ffbbbb"
| 92 || July 22 || Cardinals || 7:10pm || 1–2 || Socolovich (4–1) || Duke (3–4) || Rosenthal (29) || 42–50 || 30,046 || L4
|- align="center" bgcolor="#bbffbb"
| 93 || July 23 || @ Indians || 6:10pm || 8–1 || Samardzija (7–5) || Bauer (8–7) || — || 43–50 || 16,317 || W1
|- align="center" bgcolor="#bbffbb"
| 94 || July 24 || @ Indians || 6:10pm || 6–0 || Quintana (5–9) || Kluber (5–11) || — || 44–50 || 26,553 || W2
|- align="center" bgcolor="#bbffbb"
| 95 || July 25 || @ Indians || 6:10pm || 10–3 || Sale (9–5) || Carrasco (10–8) || — || 45–50 || 24,763 || W3
|- align="center" bgcolor="#bbffbb"
| 96 || July 26 || @ Indians || 12:10pm || 2–1 || Rodon (4–3) || Salazar (8–6) || Robertson (21) || 46–50 || 17,751 || W4
|- align="center" bgcolor="#bbffbb"
| 97 || July 27 || @ Red Sox || 6:10pm || 10–8 || Albers (1–0) || Ross (0–1) || Robertson (22) || 47–50 || 37,401 || W5
|- align="center" bgcolor="#bbffbb"
| 98 || July 28 || @ Red Sox || 6:10pm || 9–4 || Samardzija (8–5) || Miley (8–9) || — || 48–50 || 38,063 || W6
|- align="center" bgcolor="#bbffbb"
| 99 || July 29 || @ Red Sox || 6:10pm || 9–2 || Quintana (6–9) || Porcello (5-11) || — || 49–50 || 37,104 || W7
|- align="center" bgcolor="#ffbbbb"
| 100 || July 30 || @ Red Sox || 6:10pm || 2–8 || Wright (4–4) || Sale (9–6) || — || 49–51 ||  36,215 || L1
|- align="center" bgcolor="#ffbbbb"
| 101 || July 31 || Yankees || 7:10pm || 6–13 || Eovaldi (11-2) || Rodon (4–4) || — || 49–52 || 30,359 || L2
|-

|- align="center" bgcolor="#bbffbb"
| 102 || August 1 || Yankees || 6:10pm || 8–2 || Danks (6–8) || Mitchell (0–1) || — || 50–52 || 34,379 || W1
|- align="center" bgcolor="#ffbbbb"
| 103 || August 2 || Yankees || 1:10pm || 3–12 || Nova (4–3) || Samardzija (8–6) || — || 50–53 || 38,840 || L1
|- align="center" bgcolor="#ffbbbb"
| 104 || August 3 || Rays || 7:10pm || 4–5 || McGee (1–1) || Robertson (4–3) || Boxberger (27) || 50–54 || 16,496 || L2
|- align="center" bgcolor="#ffbbbb"
| 105 || August 4 || Rays || 7:10pm || 3–11 || Archer (10–8) || Sale (9–7) || — || 50–55 || 18,499 || L3
|- align="center" bgcolor="#bbffbb"
| 106 || August 5 || Rays || 1:10pm || 6–5 (10) || Robertson (5–3) || Boxberger (4–7) || — || 51–55 || 20,028 || W1
|- align="center" bgcolor="#ffbbbb"
| 107 || August 7 || @ Royals || 7:10pm || 2–3 || Volquez (4–7) || Danks (6–9) || Holland (24) || 51–56 || 36,211 || L1
|- align="center" bgcolor="#ffbbbb"
| 108 || August 8 || @ Royals || 6:10pm || 6–7 || Guthrie (8–7) || Samardzija (8–7) || Holland (25) || 51–57 || 39,302 || L2 
|- align="center" bgcolor="#ffbbbb"
| 109 || August 9 || @ Royals || 1:10pm || 4–5 || Herrera (3–2) || Petricka (3–3) || Madson (2) || 51–58 || 35,785 || L3
|- align="center" bgcolor="#bbffbb"
| 110 || August 10 || Angels || 7:10pm || 8–2 || Sale (10–7) || Shoemaker (5–8) || — || 52–58 || 20,036 || W1
|- align="center" bgcolor="#bbffbb"
| 111 || August 11 || Angels || 7:10pm || 3–0 || Rodon (5–4) || Santiago (7–6) || Robertson (23) || 53–58 || 17,137 || W2
|- align="center" bgcolor="#bbffbb"
| 112 || August 12 || Angels || 7:10pm || 3–2 (13) || Albers (2–0) || Ramos (2–1) || — || 54–58 || 17,171 || W3
|- align="center" bgcolor="#ffbbbb"
| 113 || August 14 || Cubs || 3:10pm || 5–6 || Richard (3–0) || Samardzija (8–8) || Rondón (20) || 54–59 || 36,386 || L1
|- align="center" bgcolor="#ffbbbb"
| 114 || August 15 || Cubs || 6:10pm || 3–6 || Arrieta (14–6) || Quintana (6–10) || Rondón (21) || 54–60 || 39,579 || L2
|- align="center" bgcolor="#bbffbb"
| 115 || August 16 || Cubs || 1:10pm || 3–1 || Sale (11–7) || Haren (8–8) || Robertson (24) || 55–60 || 39,475 || W1
|- align="center" bgcolor="#ffbbbb"
| 116 || August 17 || @ Angels || 9:05pm || 1–2 || Salas (3–1) || Rodon (5–5) || Street (28) || 55–61 || 36,431 || L1
|- align="center" bgcolor="#ffbbbb"
| 117 || August 18 || @ Angels || 9:05pm || 3–5 || Richards (12–9) || Danks (6–10) || Street (29) || 55–62 || 37,114 || L2
|- align="center" bgcolor="#ffbbbb"
| 118 || August 19 || @ Angels || 9:05pm || 0–1 || Weaver (5–9) || Samardzija (8–9) || Smith (2) || 55–63 || 35,036 || L3
|- align="center" bgcolor="#bbffbb"
| 119 || August 20 || @ Angels || 9:05pm || 8–2 || Quintana (7–10) || Tropeano (1–2) || — || 56–63 || 37,142 || W1
|- align="center" bgcolor="#bbffbb"
| 120 || August 21 || @ Mariners || 9:10pm || 11–4 || Sale (12–7) || Hernández (14–8) || — || 57–63 || 35,770 || W2
|- align="center" bgcolor="#bbffbb"
| 121 || August 22 || @ Mariners || 8:10pm || 6–3 (10) || Jones (1–0) || Farquhar (0–4) || Robertson (25) || 58–63 || 32,085 || W3
|- align="center" bgcolor="#ffbbbb"
| 122 || August 23 || @ Mariners || 3:10pm || 6–8 || Walker (9–7) || Danks (6–11) || Wilhelmsen (3) || 58–64 || 30,537 || L1
|- align="center" bgcolor="#ffbbbb"
| 123 || August 24 || Red Sox || 7:10pm || 4–5 || Kelly (7–6) || Samardzija (8–10) || Machi (2) || 58–65 || 18,051 || L2
|- align="center" bgcolor="#bbffbb"
| 124 || August 25 || Red Sox || 7:10pm || 5–4 || Petricka (4–3) || Miley (10–10) || Robertson (26) || 59–65 || 14,393 || W1
|- align="center" bgcolor="#ffbbbb"
| 125 || August 26 || Red Sox || 7:10pm || 0–3 || Porcello (6–11) || Jones (1–1) || Tazawa (3) || 59–66 || 17,812 || L1
|- align="center" bgcolor="#bbffbb"
| 126 || August 27 || Mariners || 7:10pm || 4–2 || Rodon (6–5) || Elías (4–7) || Robertson (27) || 60–66 || 15,076 || W1
|- align="center" bgcolor="#ffbbbb"
| 127 || August 28 || Mariners || 7:10pm || 0–2 || Walker (10–7) || Danks (6–12) || Wilhelmsen (5) || 60–67 || 27,870 || L1
|- align="center" bgcolor="#ffbbbb"
| 128 || August 29 || Mariners || 6:10pm || 6–7 || Iwakuma (6–3) || Samardzija (8–11) || Wilhelmsen (6) || 60–68 || 26,011 || L2
|- align="center" bgcolor="#bbffbb"
| 129 || August 30 || Mariners || 1:10pm || 6–5 (11) || Robertson (6–3) || Rollins (0–1) || — || 61–68 || 28,031 || W1
|-

|- align="center" bgcolor="#ffbbbb"
| 130 || September 1 || @ Twins || 7:10pm || 6–8 || Jepsen (3–6) || Duke (3–5) || Perkins (32) || 61–69 || 25,803 || L1
|- align="center" bgcolor="#ffbbbb"
| 131 || September 2 || @ Twins || 7:10pm || 0–3 || Milone (7–4) || Rodon (6–6) || Jepsen (10) || 61–70 || 22,162 || L2
|- align="center" bgcolor="#bbffbb"
| 132 || September 3 || @ Twins || 12:10pm || 6–4 || Samardzija (9–11) || Fien (4–6) || Robertson (28) || 62–70 || 25,339 || W1
|- align="center" bgcolor="#bbffbb"
| 133 || September 4 || @ Royals || 7:10pm || 12–1 || Danks (7–12) || Medlen (3–1) || — || 63–70 || 36,953 || W2
|- align="center" bgcolor="#bbffbb"
| 134 || September 5 || @ Royals || 6:10pm || 6–1 || Quintana (8–10) || Duffy (7–7) || — || 64–70 || 37,827 || W3
|- align="center" bgcolor="#bbffbb"
| 135 || September 6 || @ Royals || 1:10pm || 7–5 || Johnson (1–0) || Cueto (9–11) || Robertson (29) || 65–70 || 38,902 || W4
|- align="center" bgcolor="#ffbbbb"
| 136 || September 7 || Indians || 1:10pm || 2–3 || Bauer (11–11) || Sale (12–8) || Allen (29) || 65–71 || 14,757 || L1
|- align="center" bgcolor="#bbffbb"
| 137 || September 8 || Indians || 7:10pm || 7–4 || Rodon (7–6) || Carrasco (12–10) || — || 66–71 || 11,990 || W1
|- align="center" bgcolor="#ffbbbb"
| 138 || September 9 || Indians || 7:10pm || 4–6 || Tomlin (5–1) || Samardzija (9–12) || Allen (30) || 66–72 || 11,667 || L1
|- align="center" bgcolor="#ffbbbb"
| 139 || September 11 || Twins || 7:10pm || 2–6 || Santana (5–4) || Jones (1–2) || — || 66–73 || 15,641 || L2
|- align="center" bgcolor="#bbffbb"
| 140 || September 12 || Twins || 6:10pm || 8–2 || Quintana (9–10) || Milone (8–5) || — || 67–73 || 26,065 || W1
|- align="center" bgcolor="#ffbbbb"
| 141 || September 13 || Twins || 1:10pm || 0–7 || Gibson (10–10) || Sale (12–9) || — || 67–74 || 23,159 || L1
|- align="center" bgcolor="#bbffbb"
| 142 || September 14 || Athletics || 7:10pm || 8–7 (14) || Jennings (2–3) || León (0–2) || — || 68–74 || 12,221 || W1
|- align="center" bgcolor="#ffbbbb"
| 143 || September 15 || Athletics || 7:10pm || 6–17 || Brooks (2–3) || Samardzija (9–13) || — || 68–75 || 12,446 || L1
|- align="center" bgcolor="#bbffbb"
| 144 || September 16 || Athletics || 1:05pm || 9–4 || Johnson (2–0) || Martin (2–5) || — || 69–75 || 13,005 || W1
|- align="center" bgcolor="#ffbbbb"
| 145 || September 17 || Athletics || 9:05pm || 2–4 || Doolittle (1–0) || Robertson (6–4) || — || 69–76 || 12,406 || L1
|- align="center" bgcolor="#ffbbbb"
| 146 || September 18 || @ Indians || 6:10pm || 1–12 || Anderson (5–3) || Sale (12–10) || — || 69–77 || 16,149 || L2
|- align="center" bgcolor="#bbffbb"
| 147 || September 19 || @ Indians || 6:10pm || 4–3 || Rodon (8–6) || Carrasco (13–11) || Robertson (30) || 70–77 || 16,390 || W1
|- align="center" bgcolor="#ffbbbb"
| 148 || September 20 || @ Indians || 12:10pm || 3–6 || Tomlin (6–2) || Danks (7–13) || Allen (31) || 70–78 || 13,282 || L1
|- align="center" bgcolor="#bbffbb"
| 149 || September 21 || @ Tigers || 12:08pm || 2–0 || Samardzija (10–13) || Ryan (2–4) || — || 71–78 || 34,175 ||
|- align="center" bgcolor="#bbffbb"
| 150 || September 21 || @ Tigers || 6:08pm || 3–2 || Johnson (3–0) || Wolf (0–4) || Robertson (31) || 72–78 || 28,499 || W2
|- align="center" bgcolor="#ffbbbb"
| 151 || September 22 || @ Tigers || 6:08pm || 1–2 (10) || Hardy (5–3) || Duke (3–6) || — || 72–79 || 27,829 || L1
|- align="center" bgcolor="#ffbbbb"
| 152 || September 23 || @ Tigers || 12:08pm || 4–7 || Verlander (4–8) || Montas (0–1) || Feliz (8) || 72–80 || 31,889 || L2
|- align="center" bgcolor="#ffbbbb"
| 153 || September 24 || @ Yankees || 6:05pm || 2–3 || Pineda (12–8) || Sale (12–11) || Miller (35) || 72–81 || 35,132 || L3
|- align="center" bgcolor="#bbffbb"
| 154 || September 25 || @ Yankees || 6:05pm || 5–2 || Rodon (9–6) || Sabathia (5–10) || Robertson (32) || 73–81 || 37,316 || W1
|- align="center" bgcolor="#ffbbbb"
| 155 || September 26 || @ Yankees || 3:05pm || 1–2 || Warren (7–7) || Danks (7–14) || Miller (36) || 73–82 || 39,134 || L1
|- align="center" bgcolor="#ffbbbb"
| 156 || September 27 || @ Yankees || 12:05pm || 1–6 || Severino (5–3) || Johnson (3–1) || || 73–83 || 38,690 || L2
|- align="center" bgcolor="#bbffbb"
| 157 || September 29 || Royals || 7:10pm || 4–2 || Samardzija (11–13) || Cueto (10–13) || Robertson (33) || 74–83 || 13,024 || W1
|- align="center" bgcolor="#ffbbbb"
| 158 || September 30 || Royals || 7:10pm || 3–5 || Morales (4–2) || Robertson (6–5) || Davis (15) || 74–84 || 12,818 || L1
|-

|- align="center" bgcolor="#ffbbbb"
| 159 || October 1 || Royals || 7:10pm || 4–6 || Medlen (6–2) || Danks (7–15) || Madson (3) || 74–85 || 12,825 || L2
|- align="center" bgcolor="#bbffbb"
| 160 || October 2 || Tigers || 7:10pm || 2–1 || Sale (13–11) || Simón (13–12) || Robertson (34) || 75–85 || 18,030 || W1
|- align="center" bgcolor="#bbffbb"
| 161 || October 3 || Tigers || 6:10pm || 4–3 || Jones (2–2) || Feliz (3–4) || – || 76–85 || 17,772 || W2
|- align="center" bgcolor="#ffbbbb"
| 162 || October 4 || Tigers || 2:10pm || 0–6 || Norris (3–2) || Montas (0–2) || – || 76–86 || 19,800 || L1
|-

Personnel

Opening Day lineup

Roster

Statistics

Batting
Note: G = Games played; AB = At bats; R = Runs scored; H = Hits; 2B = Doubles; 3B = Triples; HR = Home runs; RBI = Runs batted in; BB = Base on balls; SO = Strikeouts; AVG = Batting average; SB = Stolen bases

Pitching
Note: W = Wins; L = Losses; ERA = Earned run average; G = Games pitched; GS = Games started; SV = Saves; IP = Innings pitched; H = Hits allowed; R = Runs allowed; ER = Earned runs allowed; HR = Home runs allowed; BB = Walks allowed; K = Strikeouts

Farm system

LEAGUE CHAMPIONS: AZL White Sox

References

External links
2015 Chicago White Sox at Baseball Reference
2015 Chicago White Sox season Official Site
2015 Chicago White Sox season at ESPN

Chicago White Sox seasons
Chicago White Sox
White Sox